Uttara Foods and Feeds is a group company of the  multimillion-dollar V H Conglomerate, the leader in poultry business in India. It was started by B.Venkatesh Rao, Joint M D of the Vekateshwara Hatchries Group.

Uttara Foods and Feeds started by setting up a modern plant to manufacture pellet feed using Swiss machinery and know how.

To meet the food requirement of the growing population Venky group decided to foray into the processed foods industry. While the focus was on Indian market it was soon realized that export market had a lot of potential. The company has a modern biscuit manufacturing plant capable of production of both normal and cream biscuits. Majority of the produce is exported to countries throughout the world.

This is how Uttara Foods, the processed food division of Uttara foods and feeds came into being.

Animal feed companies of India
Manufacturing companies based in Pune
Companies with year of establishment missing